William James Seedsman (18 September 1914 – 10 October 2001) was an Australian rules footballer who played with Hawthorn and Collingwood in the Victorian Football League (VFL).

Notes

External links 

Profile on Collingwood Forever

1914 births
2001 deaths
Australian rules footballers from Victoria (Australia)
Hawthorn Football Club players
Collingwood Football Club players
Kew Football Club players